Neville Brown (born 26 February 1966) is a British former boxer who was British middleweight champion between 1993 and 1998, and also fought for Commonwealth, European, and World titles.

Career
From Burton-upon-Trent, Neville Brown first tasted success as an amateur, winning the ABA light-middleweight title in both 1987 and 1989. He had his first professional fight in November 1989, a fourth round stoppage of Spencer Alton. After winning his first eleven professional fights, he suffered his first defeat in July 1991, when he was stopped in the first round by Paul Wesley. He avenged that defeat three months later, stopping Wesley in the third round.

In November 1993, he challenged for Frank Grant's British middleweight title, stopping the defending champion in the seventh round. Two months later he successfully defended the title against Andy Flute. In July 1994, he had his first fight outside the UK when he travelled to Italy to challenge for Agostino Cardamone's European title; Cardamone stopped him in the seventh round. Back in the UK he made successful defences of his British title against Antonio Fernandez, Carlo Colarusso, and Shaun Cummins, all inside the distance.

In March 1996 he got a World title shot, challenging for Steve Collins' WBO super middleweight title. Collins had Brown down in the first round, and twice more in the eleventh before the fight was stopped.

Back down at middleweight, Brown made a successful defence of his British title in January 1997 against Willie Quinn. Three months later he made a second challenge for the European title, this time being stopped in the sixth by Hacine Cherifi. In January 1998 he lost his British title to Glenn Catley. After winning two of his next three fights, he faced Sam Soliman in June 2000 for the vacant Commonwealth middleweight title; Soliman stopped him in the ninth round. Brown subsequently retired from boxing.

Brown went on to work as a boxing coach and personal trainer, and returned to the ring in July 2014 for a charity exhibition fight against Collins.

Professional boxing record

References

External links

Career record at boxrec.com

1966 births
Living people
English male boxers
Middleweight boxers
Sportspeople from Burton upon Trent
England Boxing champions